Power Rangers Ninja Storm is the 2003 Power Rangers season that tells the story of the fight between the Wind Ninja Rangers and the evil Space Ninjas led by Lothor.

The Power Rangers
This generation of Power Rangers is unique in which they were originally two separate teams; the Wind Rangers of the Wind Ninja Academy and the Thunder Rangers of the Thunder Ninja Academy. After initial hostilities, they banded together and were later joined by the Green Samurai Ranger.

During the events of "Shattered Grid," when summoned by Zordon, the entire Ninja Storm team appears, including the Thunder Rangers and Cameron.  This would indicate that Drakkon had yet to invade their universe prior to Zordon's summons.

Wind Rangers
The Wind Rangers are the last students of the Wind Ninja Academy, given their morphers by Sensei Kanoi Watanabe and his son Cam when the other students were kidnapped by Lothor.

Shane Clarke
Shane Clarke (Pua Magasiva) is the main character and the Red Wind Ranger. He is the leader of the Ninja Storm team. He has a serious attitude. Shane is an excellent skateboarder, and his love of flight is evident in his fighting style. Shane is scared of spiders. When he was young, Shane saved an alien woman named Skyla from a bounty hunter named Vexacus, and that alien later returned and gave Shane the power of the Battlizer armor. After Lothor's defeat, Shane became an instructor at the Wind Ninja Academy. Shane commands the Hawk Ninja Zord.

Shane watches out for his friends and tries to make sure Tori, Dustin, and later Cam stay out of trouble. When the Bradley brothers, Hunter and Blake, show up in town, Shane stresses the importance of knowing whom to trust to Dustin as Shane is the only one to suspect that the brothers aren't who they say they are.

Shane doesn't come to trust Hunter or Blake until the incident with Toxipod. During that time, Shane is aggravated with the fact that Hunter and Blake always seem to have ill intentions when their groups meet in battle. When the fact that both Blake and Hunter have been brainwashed by Choobo is revealed to him and his friends, Shane slowly comes to trust Blake and Hunter when they are brought back to their senses. Hunter and Shane's differences cause them to develop a rivalry, but they eventually overcome their differences and become friends.

Thanks to his ninja training, Shane possesses several superpowers independent of and prior to the acquisition of his Ranger skills. Like his fellow ninjas, Shane possesses superhuman speed and can move faster than the eye can see, leap higher than an average person, evade detection by normal persons, and focus his inner energies to resist mental attacks and manipulation. Shane's ninja powers give him the ability to control the element of air for effects including projecting gusts of wind as an offensive weapon, and "walking" on air as if on solid ground.

Shane's older brother, Porter (played by Pua Magasiva's actual brother, Robbie Magasiva), who was a successful businessman, was concerned about Shane's seeming lack of a sense of responsibility, and paid him a visit, lecturing his younger brother on the matter. After accidentally discovering that Shane was the Red Ranger, however, Porter gained significant respect for Shane, realizing the measure of responsibility that his younger brother had taken upon himself.

When Lothor comes back in Power Rangers Dino Thunder, Shane temporarily becomes evil alongside his teammates. They battle the Dino Rangers, but are set free by their comrades. The Ninja and Dino Rangers then team up to do battle with Lothor and Mesogog's combined forces, with him teaming up with Red Dino Ranger Conner.

Afterwards, the Wind Rangers lose their Ranger powers again, though they would later regain them by Sentinel Knight through some means in order to join the Ranger army in Power Rangers Super Megaforce.

Tori Hanson
Tori Hanson (Sally Martin) is the main female protagonist, and the Blue Wind Ranger. She is also notable for being the first female Blue Ranger in Power Rangers history.

Tori is the female member of the team and a feisty tomboy with a kind heart. She is loyal to her friends, but sticks up for Cam when her fellow Rangers pick on him, and has an innate skill for ending conflicts with words instead of fists. Tori has a fear of her hair being cut off. Tori Hanson has an affinity for water, surfing in her spare time and mastering water based fighting techniques while training at the Wind Ninja Academy. Tori's ninja training has endowed her with skills independent of her Ranger powers. Like her fellow ninjas, Tori possesses superhuman speed and can move faster than the eye can see, leap higher than an average person, evade detection by normal persons, and focus her inner energies to resist mental attacks and manipulation. Her training based on her affinity for water allows her to move across water as if it were solid ground, create high-powered bursts of water as an offensive weapon, and manipulate and control water for a number of effects, such as creating objects. As the Blue Ranger, Tori relies on the power of water to thwart evil, and pilots the Dolphin Zord. In the finale, Tori also becomes an instructor at the Wind Ninja Academy.

When Lothor comes back in Power Rangers Dino Thunder, Tori temporarily becomes evil alongside her teammates. They battle the Dino Rangers, but are set free by their comrades, Cam, Blake and Hunter. The Ninja and Dino Rangers then team up to do battle with Lothor and Mesogog's combined forces, with her teaming up with Yellow Dino Ranger Kira. Afterwards, the Wind Rangers lose their powers, leaving things to the next generation.

In the Power Rangers Operation Overdrive team up episode "Once a Ranger", Tori is called upon by the Sentinel Knight along with Adam Park, Kira Ford, Bridge Carson, and Xander Bly to relieve the Operation Overdrive Rangers when they lost their powers. Sentinel Knight restored her powers, and she later fought alongside the Overdrive Rangers. It is also revealed that Tori now runs her own surf shop.

Her powers apparently either remained intact or were later restored again, as she took part in the final battle with the Armada in Power Rangers Super Megaforce.

Dustin Brooks
Waldo 'Dustin' Brooks (Glenn McMillan) is the co-protagonist and the Yellow Wind Ranger as well as the second male Yellow Ranger (after Tideus, the Yellow Alien Ranger). As such, he is capable of fighting underground and moving through the earth. Dustin pilots the Lion Ninja Zord and his specialized weapon was called the Lion Hammer, which he could slam into the ground and cause small earthquakes. He can also split himself into two separate fighters. Dustin and his fellow Ranger Shane have been best friends since childhood. By the end of the series, Dustin graduates from the Wind Academy and stays on as a teacher.

He is the "comic book geek" of the Wind Rangers, and was a fan of previous Rangers, who were considered urban legend, visible when they are first given morphers and he is the first to morph and (in turn) show Shane and Tori how to morph. He is somewhat naive and gullible. This is clearly exhibited in his meeting with Hunter and Blake. Dustin is the first to encounter the Thunder Rangers, Hunter and Blake Bradley, and quickly befriends them due to their mutual interest in motocross. Being the friendly guy he is, he introduces Blake and Hunter to Tori and Shane, not knowing that the Bradleys were the Thunder Rangers who were attacking them at the time.

Dustin is an expert motocross rider, which he claims his father Jake "Taught him everything [he] knows", and works at the bike store Storm Chargers. He also uses copious amounts of dudespeak and has some degree of proficiency in the saxophone (he was shown playing a tenor in "Shimazu Returns, Part 2"). Marah once conned him into believing she had reformed and would help the Rangers defeat Lothor, but it was a ruse. Despite Marah's trickery, Dustin and Marah did seem to harbor interest in each other, but nothing was ever expanded on.

When Lothor comes back in Power Rangers Dino Thunder, Dustin temporarily becomes evil alongside his teammates. They battle the Dino Rangers, but are set free by their comrades. The Ninja and Dino Rangers then team up to do battle with Lothor and Mesogog's combined forces, with him teaming up with Blue Dino Ranger Ethan. Afterwards, the Wind Ranger loses his Ranger powers but continues on as a teacher in the Wind Ninja Academy.

He apparently regained his powers by Sentinel Knight at least temporarily when he joined the Ranger army in Super Megaforce.

By the end of the series, Dustin has grown and matured a lot, but his personality remains much the same.

Thunder Rangers

The known Rangers of the Thunder Ninja Academy are the Crimson and Navy Thunder Rangers. The two, who are adoptive brothers, were chosen by Sensei Omino when their academy was attacked by Lothor and have the power of thunder. They were originally enemies of the Wind Rangers, having been lied to by Lothor into believing that the Wind Rangers' sensei was responsible for the death of their parents. They returned to the side of good when they were visited by the spirits of their parents and told them the truth.

Their weapons are Thunder Staffs, which can also transform into the Tornado Star (a boomerang weapon), Thunder Shield (a hoop weapon), or can extend into long staffs, to attack their enemies. Each Ranger also carries an individual weapon, the Crimson Blaster and Navy Antler. Their Zords are in the form of beetles.

Their powers were absorbed by Lothor into Cam's Samurai Amulet.

Hunter Bradley
Hunter Bradley is the Crimson Thunder Ranger played by Adam Tuominen and voiced by Scott McShane in the Power Rangers: Super Legends video game.

He is the older brother of Blake Bradley, the Navy Thunder Ranger. The two were raised at the Thunder Ninja Academy by Sensei Omino after the death of their adoptive parents. (like Eric Myers from Power Rangers Time Force) Initially brooding and standoffish, Hunter eventually learns the value of friendship and teamwork outside of himself and through his time as a Ranger later warms up to the Wind Rangers; he even gets a job at Storm Chargers, thanks to Dustin.

When we first meet Hunter and Blake, they are revealed as the two Thunder Rangers that are out for revenge on the Wind Rangers' sensei, Kanoi Watanabe. This was actually a lie told by Lothor, the real killer of the Bradleys' parents as well as the main antagonist of the story. Because the Thunder Rangers were misled, they became the enemies of the Wind Rangers. This was quickly fixed when their parents' ghosts came to Blake and Hunter and told him that they were after the wrong person.

Hunter and Blake leave for a while even though they assure the Wind Rangers that they've turned to the right side, but this changes when an infiltration aboard Lothor's ship goes wrong. While they are on the ship, Choobo captures and brainwashes them so that they become a threat to the Wind Ninja once more. Choobo traps the Wind and Thunder Rangers on an island so that they can kill each other, but the Thunder Rangers regain their memories. As a last resort, Lothor uses a ray that causes Hunter to fly into a rage and attack everyone. Hunter accidentally takes a breath of mist that makes him even more confused and angry, but the Wind Ninjas and Blake later help him come back to his senses. The Bradleys come to fight alongside the Wind Rangers, this time permanently.

Hunter later became the head instructor at the Thunder Academy, after Lothor stole his Ranger powers. He maintains a friendly rivalry with Shane.

When Lothor returned from the Abyss of Evil during Power Rangers Dino Thunder, Hunter teamed up with Blake and Cam to recover the Thunder and Samurai Powers from the Abyss. They freed the mind-controlled Wind Rangers, and teamed up with the Dino Rangers to face Lothor and Mesogog's combined forces, in which he and Blake fought alongside Black Dino Ranger Tommy Oliver. After the battle, Hunter discovered that his rangers powers had been depleted, thus ending his time as a Power Ranger. He continued on as the head teacher at the Thunder Ninja Academy, later taking up the Ranger mantle again when an army of Rangers was formed to assist the Megaforce Rangers in Power Rangers Super Megaforce.

The Crimson Ranger's arsenal included his Thunder Staff, the Crimson Blaster, the Crimson Tsunami Cycle, and the Ninja Glider Cycle, a special motorbike adapted to transform into a motor-propelled glider. His personal Zord was the Crimson Insectizord (which is modeled after a Hercules Beetle). His Power Spheres included the Spin Blade and pieces of the MiniZord and the Ninja Firebird and the Sting Blaster.

Blake Bradley
Blake Bradley is the Navy Thunder Ranger played by Jorgito Vargas, Jr. and voiced by Kenn Michael in the Power Rangers: Super Legends video game.

He is the youngest brother of Hunter Bradley, the Crimson Thunder Ranger. After Blake and Hunter's parents died, their sensei took them in and they began their martial arts training at the Thunder Ninja Academy. More sociable and charming than his older brother, Blake is a skilled motorbike racer and is the best of all the Rangers at stick fighting; being able to take on both Tori and Dustin with ease.

In the beginning, Blake, like his brother, are fighting against the Wind Ninja when Lothor feeds the Bradley brothers the lie that the Wind Ninja's sensei was the one who killed their parents when in reality, Lothor was the one to kill them. Blake goes so far as to play on Tori's concerns for him to find the location of Ninja Ops so that he and Hunter can get to Sensei. When Blake and Hunter find that Lothor is the real one responsible for their parents' deaths, they decide to leave Blue Bay Harbor without a word to the others, unsure of themselves and their destiny as Rangers.

Blake and Hunter return soon after, now with the resolve to kill Lothor. Blake decides to let Tori in on their plan to infiltrate Lothor's ship, assuring her that they'd call if there was trouble. When Blake and Hunter make the mistake of trusting Choobo to get on the ship, they are both brainwashed again into believing the Wind Rangers were evil. All five Rangers are transported onto an island and they fight each other several times. Blake is the first Thunder Ranger who shakes the brainwashing effects and joins the Wind Rangers in an effort to free Hunter, who is driven mad by the combination of Lothor's memory ray and the toxic mist on the island. After this turn of events, the Thunder Brothers decide to fight alongside the Wind Rangers, deciding that teamwork was the best way to destroy their common enemy Lothor.

His Ranger powers are drained by Lothor using Cam's amulet and are seemingly lost when Lothor is sealed within the Abyss. However, in Dino Thunder, the Rangers temporarily regain their powers and fight alongside the Dino Thunder Rangers to fight the combined threat of Lothor and Mesogog. After the battle it is revealed that Blake's morpher is depleted, resulting in the permanent loss of his Ranger powers. Despite this, he would appear as part of the Ranger army in Super Megaforce.

Blake's weapons include a Navy Antler, Thunder Staff, and a Thunder Blade. His gear includes a Thunder Morpher and a Tsunami Cycle. He pilots the Navy Beetlezord (which is modeled after a Stag Beetle). He shared the Serpent Sword Power Sphere with Hunter for their Thunder Megazord.

Cameron "Cam" Watanabe
Cameron "Cam" Watanabe (Jason Chan) is the son of Sensei Kanoi Watanabe and Miko, nephew of Lothor, and cousin to Marah and Kapri. Kanoi made a promise to Cam's mother that Cam would never be trained in the ways of the ninja. As such, Cam was not a student at the Wind Ninja Academy, but he was a constant presence and usually at his father's side. Unable to train, he began putting his talents to use in the technological arena.

After the academy was destroyed by Lothor and his minions, Cam took Shane, Tori, and Dustin into a high-tech underground dojo. Under instruction from Sensei Watanabe, who had been turned into a guinea pig, he (reluctantly) presented the three with Wind Morphers, allowing them to become the Wind Rangers.

Throughout the series, Cam used his brilliant intellect to construct/maintain power spheres, Zords, and weapons for the Rangers. For example, when Sensei was captured by the Thunder Rangers, Cam created a powerful forcefield to protect his father. After Hunter and Blake joined the team, Cam discovered the mystery piece in their Megazord that would allow the Storm Megazord to combine with the Thunder Megazord.

Early on, Cam often displayed a sarcastic personality and low opinion towards Shane, Tori and Dustin. Besides their faulty track record in training, Cam was also jealous that they got to be Rangers and not him. When this became known, Tori suggested Cam talk to his father, while Shane, Dustin, Hunter and Blake argued to Sensei Watanabe that Cam would make the perfect Ranger.

Throughout the series, Cam began to change his opinion towards Shane, Tori, and Dustin when Shane, Tori, and Dustin proved him wrong time and time again and eventually he became good friends with them and he began to see them as great Rangers and great ninjas.

Soon afterwards, the Rangers' powers were stolen and Lothor was poised for final victory. When Sensei mentioned a great power source lost to time, Cam used the Scroll of Time to travel into the past. He arrived at the Wind Ninja Academy when Kanoi was a student. Surprisingly, he also met an unmentioned twin brother named Kiya as well as a mystery samurai revealed to be Miko, his mother. Miko possessed the Samurai Amulet, which Cam recognized as the great power source he came back for. However, Kiya also wanted it and framed Cam for the theft. Kanoi exposed Kiya's plot – leading to a brutal fight between Cam and his future uncle, who had knowledge of the dark ninja arts. Cam won and had successfully claimed the amulet. Kiya was stripped of name and rank, and banished from Earth. Before he was off-world, Cam witnessed Kiya take the name "Lothor" and vow revenge. Cam was unable to do anything to change history as he had to return home. Miko let him keep the amulet, allowing Cam to become the Green Samurai Ranger and use the Samurai Star Megazord to save the present.

As the Samurai Ranger, he helped the others fight Lothor's evil, still shocked by the discovery that the evil ninja master was his uncle. Because of the demands that being a Ranger put on him, he created a holographic virtual duplicate of himself he dubbed "Cyber-Cam" to take over day-to-day running of the dojo and maintenance of the equipment. Cyber-Cam was given a "thug" persona, with wardrobe and vocabulary to match, and was highly skilled in extreme sports; in short, everything that Cam was not. Cyber-Cam briefly locked Cam up, so he could enjoy life. Cam later reprogrammed him to be focused on work in Ninja Ops, though the "thug" persona and wardrobe remained.

It is noted that after the events of "Samurai's Journey," Lothor began to pick on Cam more than the other Rangers. This could be because Cam is his nephew and because Cam was indirectly responsible for Lothor's banishment. Lothor did know it was Cam, as he later recalled their "meeting in the past".

Notably, Cam is the only Ninja Storm Ranger not to be turned evil, like the Thunder Rangers ("Return of Thunder") and later the Wind Rangers ("Thunder Storm").

When Lothor was finally defeated, Cam again became an advisor at the Wind Ninja Academy, helping the other Rangers in their instructor duties, and keeping a special watch over Lothor's nieces (and his cousins) Marah and Kapri, who had reformed and enrolled at the academy. Within a year time, he got closer to the girls and shared a bonding moment.

When Lothor escaped from the Abyss of Evil in Power Rangers Dino Thunder, Cam later briefly regained his samurai powers and re-teamed with his fellow Ninja Rangers, as well as teaming up with the Dino Rangers, to battle the combined forces of Lothor and Mesogog, in which he teamed up with White Dino Ranger Trent. After the battle, it was revealed that Cam's morpher was fully depleted resulting in the permanent loss of his Ranger powers.

However, a means of restoring them-at least temporarily-was apparently found, as he joined the Ranger army in battling the Armada forces that invaded Earth. He would later join his teammates in the final battle with the Armada forces in Power Rangers Super Megaforce.

Zords

Storm Ninja Zords
The animal-themed zords of the Wind Rangers are called the Storm Ninja Zords.
 Hawkzord: Shane Clarke's personal zord materializes through a holographic portal disguised as an airplane that can perform the Flame Attack.
 Lionzord: Dustin Brooks' personal zord materializes through a holographic portal disguised as a ferris wheel that can perform the Lion Tornado Blast.
 Dolphinzord: Tori Hanson's personal zord materializes through a holographic portal disguised as a cruise ship that can perform the Dolphin Water Wall.

Thunder Ninja Zords
The insect-themed zords of the Thunder Rangers are called the Thunder Ninja Zords.
 Crimson Insectizord: Hunter Bradley's Hercules Beetle-themed Zord.
 Navy Beetlezord: Blake Bradley's Stag Beetle-themed Zord.

Power Spheres
Power Spheres can be summoned by the Rangers using the Power discs.
 Power Sphere 01: Serpent Sword is a dragon-themed sword.
 Power Sphere 02: Ram Hammer is a bighorn sheep-themed war hammer.
 Power Sphere 03: Turtle Mace is a turtle-themed flail.
 Power Sphere Combo 01: Flail Combo is the combination of the Ram Hammer and Turtle Mace to form a flail weapon.
 Power Sphere 04: Spin Blade is a flower-themed axe.
 Power Sphere 05: Lion Laser is a white lion-themed laser minigun.
 Power Sphere 06: The Squid Drill is a squid-themed drill.
 Power Sphere Combo 02: Turbine Combo is the combination of the Lion Laser and Squid Drill to form a drilling turbine weapon.
 Power Spheres 07, 08: Minizord is the combination of Power Spheres 07 and 08 to form a small humanoid Zord. Minizord can split two fists and helmet for Thunderstorm Megazord. Voice by Greg Johnson.
 Power Sphere 09: The Ninja Scarf can be a shield.
 Power Sphere 10: Bee Spinner is a bee-themed sling weapon.
 Power Sphere 11: Sting Blaster is a horseshoe crab-themed blaster with a bayonet.
 Power Sphere 12: Spider Catcher is a spider-themed grappling hook.
 Power Sphere 13: Super Stamp is the only Power Sphere that is the sphere itself.
 Power Sphere 14: Star Blazer is a crimson, spiked and starfish-themed shuriken.
 Power Spheres 15, 16, 17: Ninja Firebird is the combination of Power Spheres 15, 16 and 17 to form a phoenix. Ninja Firebird can split two fists and helmet for Hurricane Megazord.

Other Zords
 Samurai Star: Cameron Watanabe's swallow-themed helicopter.
 Mighty Mammoth Zord: A mammoth-themed Carrier Zord.

Megazords
 Storm Megazord: The combination of Hawkzord, Lionzord and Dolphinzord that can perform the Blizzard Flurry and Dolphin Blast. Armed with Serpent Sword to perform the Triple Strike finisher.
 Storm Megazord Lightning Mode: Storm Megazord can transform into Lightning Mode, giving it increased speed and agility, but only for 60 seconds. It can perform the Ramp Attack.
 Thunder Megazord: The combination of Crimson Insectizord and Navy Beetlezord.
 Thunderstorm Megazord: The combination of Storm Megazord, Thunder Megazord and Minizord. The finisher is Lion Blaster.
 Thunderstorm Ultrazord: The combination of Thunderstorm Megazord and Mighty Mammoth Zord.
 Samurai Star Megazord: Samurai Star Chopper can transform into Samurai Star Megazord.
 Samurai Storm Megazord: The combination of Samurai Star Chopper and Storm Megazord replacing Dolphinzord to become the right arm.
 Samurai Thunder Megazord: The combination of Samurai Star Chopper and Thunder Megazord.
 Hurricane Megazord: The combination of Storm Megazord, Thunder Megazord, Samurai Star Megazord and Ninja Firebird.
 Hurricane Ultrazord: The combination of Hurricane Megazord, Mighty Mammoth Zord and Power Spheres (with the exception of the Ninja Scarf and the Super Stamp).

Allies

Sensei Kanoi Watanabe
Sensei Kanoi Watanabe (Grant McFarland as an adult and as a guinea pig, Daniel Sing as a teen) is the mentor of the Wind Rangers and father to Cameron Watanabe. Kanoi Watanabe was originally an air ninja and is also the twin brother of Kiya Watanabe/Lothor. When Lothor attacked the Wind Academy, he used his magic to turn Sensei Watanabe into a guinea pig, albeit with the ability to speak and bipedal movement.

Kanoi sensed potential in the three students who became the Wind Rangers. He also sensed it in his son Cameron (Cam), but had promised his wife that he would not train Cam in the ways of the Ninja. So, instead, Cam learned to become a samurai, and met his father in the past before obtaining the Samurai Cyclone Morpher.

In a later episode, Cam created a machine that should have returned his father to a human, but instead he swapped bodies with both Shane and Dustin, before finally returning to his trapped hamster body. It reveals he's proficient in Earth Style, despite beginning his ninja training as an Air Style Ninja.

The Sensei of the alternate dimension that Tori ended up in was also evil like the Ninja Rangers.

Kanoi was eventually restored to human form when Lothor raided Ninja Ops when hit by Lothor's energy attack. Following Lothor's defeat, Kanoi returned to the Wind Academy.

Some time later in Power Rangers Dino Thunder, Kanoi was captured and impersonated by a vengeful Lothor (who had escaped from the Abyss of Evil), who tricked the Wind Rangers and turned them into his servants. Kanoi later escaped with the help of his nieces Marah and Kapri, and helped Cam and the Thunder Rangers recover their powers from the Abyss of Evil. He then worked together with Hayley to advise the Rangers in their team-up battle.

Kelly Halloway
Kelly Halloway (Megan Nicol) is the owner of Storm Chargers, a sporting goods store that the Power Rangers frequent and where Dustin is an employee.

Her counterpart in the alternate dimension that Tori visited had a goth-like appearance and was the boss of Zurgane and Choobo.

Cyber-Cam
Cyber-Cam (Jason Chan) is a holographic virtual duplicate of himself he dubbed "Cyber-Cam" to take over day-to-day running of the dojo and maintenance of the equipment. Cyber-Cam was given a "thug" persona with wardrobe and vocabulary to match and was highly skilled in extreme sports. In short, Cyber-Cam was everything that Cam was not. Cyber-Cam briefly locked Cam up, so he could enjoy life. Cam later reprogrammed him to be focused on work in Ninja Ops, though the "thug" persona and wardrobe remained.

When it came to Lothor finding the underground dojo, he had Kapri infected Cyber-Cam with a computer virus while he was doing some outside repairs to the manual override and had him lead them into the dojo. Afterwards, he withdrew into the Ninja Ops center.

Kyle, Eric and Tally
A trio of teens resembling Shane, Dustin and Tori, respectively. They first appeared to back up Cam and Hunter while fighting a Kelzak army, and though their help came in handy, Cam warned them to not get in their way. They were not seen again until the Wind Ninja Academy opened again, enrolling as ninja apprentices. Cam got worried about the continual stress he will go through especially with Eric and his friends. His father assured him to leave their training to Shane, Dustin and Tori.

Eric was the identical twin brother of Conner McKnight the Red Dino Ranger. Both were portrayed by James Napier.

Evil Space Ninjas

Lothor
Born Kiya Watanabe, Lothor (portrayed by Grant McFarland as an adult, Daniel Sing as a teenager) is an exiled evil ninja master. His history is revealed by the middle of the season during the "Samurai's Journey" three-parter. When Cam Watanabe travels back in time to acquire a great power source, he meets younger versions of his parents and learns of an unheard uncle, Kiya. Kiya is shown to be loose with the rules, in contrast to his twin brother, Kanoi. However, nobody expected Kiya to seek to steal the Samurai Amulet (the great power source) from Cam's mother. Attempting to frame Cam, his plan was foiled and exposed by Kanoi, who discovered him using dark ninja powers. After Cam defeated Kiya in combat, the sensei of the academy banished Kiya from Earth to the farthest parts of space where his evil powers will do no harm. Cam realizes the truth, as Kiya proclaims before being banished, "I will take the name of the ancient warrior of evil. From this point, I will be known as Lothor! … I will not forget the part you played in this, brother! I will have my revenge!" As a student at the Wind Ninja Academy, he wore a yellow and black uniform, implying that he studied under the Earth element.

Lothor spent years in space to slowly build an army of evil space ninja (space aliens trained in the dark ninja arts). He intended to conquer Earth and destroy all the protecting ninja academies with their ninja masters, allowing him to become the ultimate dark ninja master. He also first encountered the bounty hunter, Vexacus, and developed an intense rivalry with him. He also apparently married during his exile, as his nieces Kapri and Marah were not blood relatives and only were related by marriage, though no wife was ever seen or otherwise alluded to.

Before his attack on Earth in the first episode, Lothor had returned to Earth previously in secret (a violation of his former sensei's orders). His purpose on this visit is unknown, but while there, he killed the Bradleys, the adoptive parents of Hunter and Blake Bradley. These two were taken in by Sensei Omino and trained at the Thunder Ninja Academy, which, unfortunately, was the first place attacked by Lothor's army. He captured the Thunder Ninja students and Sensei Omino, and even managed to convince Hunter and Blake Bradley that the Wind Ninja's current sensei, Kanoi, was responsible for their adoptive parents' deaths.

The Wind Ninja Academy, now under the leadership of Sensei Kanoi Watanabe, Lothor's brother, was the next target. Again, Lothor kidnapped the students of the academy. When they were fighting, Sensei Watanabe turned himself into a guinea pig.

Lothor's victory was short-lived, and he soon realized that three students had escaped the purge of the Wind Ninja Academy (Shane, Dustin, and Tori). Being the only three remaining, they were presented with morphers, allowing them to become Wind Power Rangers. These new Power Rangers foiled Lothor's plans on numerous occasions, and he has sent monstrous warriors after them, but they all fail. Nevertheless, he has always stuck by the evil code for destroying a Power Ranger, that "they must be in their true Ranger form.". Lothor has a campy sense of humor, which is often reflected from his frustrations with his monsters/nieces when they fail to best the Power Rangers, or in some predictable occasions (e.g. after making a monster grow, he stares at the camera and asks the audience if they really expected him to make it smaller.) Such fourth wall breaking manifested itself in several other of Lothor's asides (in the season finale, piloting the final giant robot the Rangers would fight, he comments on the battle was the most fun he'd had all season.) as well.

In the final episodes of the series, treason and betrayal among Lothor's generals saw them all dying off - at each other's hands or at the hands of the Power Rangers. It was soon revealed that these deaths had all been a part of Lothor's great plan, and that when each had died, their spirits had gone to the "Abyss of Evil". With the help of Cam's stolen Samurai Amulet, Lothor was able to make the Abyss overflow and the dead generals and armies were all released, free to destroy the world. Shane was quickly able to destroy the resurrected generals with his Battlizer while the other Rangers tossed the other monsters back into the Abyss. Lothor then managed to use Cam's Samurai Amulet to drain the Rangers of their Ranger powers. Fortunately, Shane, Dustin and Tori were able to use their inner ninja powers to seal him and his deceased army in the Abyss of Evil, saving the planet.

An alternate dimension that Goldwinger had Tori transported to featured Lothor as a good guy who worked as the Mayor of Blue Bay Harbor and feared this reality's Ninja Rangers. After coming to his senses, Mayor Lothor and his allies helped Tori defeat the evil Ninja Rangers.

Almost a year later in Power Rangers Dino Thunder episode "Thunder Storm," Lothor escapes from the Abyss of Evil and again captures the ninja students. Impersonating his brother Kanoi, he lures the Wind Ninja Rangers to a beach where he tricks them into accepting new morphers which make them evil. They are eventually freed by the Thunder Rangers and Cam, who have managed to retrieve their old powers. Lothor then teams up with Mesogog, Dino Thunder's main antagonist. After a battle with both Ninja Storm and Dino Thunder, in which both their warriors are defeated, Lothor sends Marah and Kapri to battle against the rangers as a last effort to win. However, he finds out too late both girls had double crossed him. Especially when Lothor sees the rescued Ninja Students freed, along with Marah and Kapri bonding with Cam. Feeling like the alliance is no longer needed, Mesogog fights Lothor and ends up trapping him in a glass jar. Mesogog's Island Base was destroyed a few months later with the final fate of Lothor left unresolved. As he is not seen again, Lothor was destroyed in Mesogog's Island Base.

Zurgane
Zurgane is the main general in Lothor's army. He enjoys destroying everything in the service of Lothor.

Even though the Thunder Rangers were on Lothor's side at the time, he despised them, for they got the glory and attention that he wanted from Lothor. He is always mocked by his crewmates because he doesn't have a mouth nor eyes. Zurgane is known to be Lothor's technical advisor as he fixes objects on the ship and builds his own evil Zords and even uses robotic monsters. Zurgane's powers are teleportation, energy projection, and the ability to extend swords from his shoulders.

An alternate dimension that Goldwinger had Tori transported to had Zurgane with the personality that the normal Choobo has where both of them worked at Storm Chargers. He is among those who help Mayor Lothor fight the evil Ninja Rangers.

Zurgane was destroyed by Vexacus, another of Lothor's generals. Vexacus sought absolute power over Lothor's forces, and later collaborated with Marah and Kapri to destroy Motodrone and Shimazu. After the destruction of Zurgane's latest Zord by the Power Rangers, Zurgane is physically in bad shape. Vexacus took advantage of that in order to perform a sneak attack, destroying him. When the Abyss was open Zurgane returned, only to be destroyed again by Shane.

He had later returned again from the reopened Abyss in Power Rangers Dino Thunder. He first appeared inside the Abyss with a small pack of monsters to prevent Cam and the Thunder Rangers from reclaiming the Samurai Amulet and left them to fall to their doom after a brief battle. He returned to the surfaced to serve Lothor and was partnered with Elsa of Mesogog's army. He fought against the Thunder Rangers and Tommy Oliver who destroyed him the third time with his Brachio Staff's Energy Orb attack.

Zurgane was voiced by Peter Rowley.

Choobo
Choobo is the lieutenant of Lothor's army. He resembles a Ōnyūdō/frog-themed monster wearing mountain-climbing equipment with a mustache and green reptilian skin. He wielded a white and red-striped baton and has a Mama's boy-like personality. He can summon energy spheres from his fridge-like backpack to trap his enemies. Sometimes, he uses monsters based on animals. He could also control his opponents' bodies like puppets and suck them into his backpack and send them into his own pocket dimension inside it where he would appear as a giant head that breathed smelly gas.

He was promoted to general when he captured the Thunder Rangers and manipulated them to oppose the Wind Rangers again. However, he failed to destroy the Rangers when the Thunder Rangers realized they were being manipulated. Because of this, Choobo was banished from Lothor's ship. He swore revenge, and stole a Scroll of Empowerment, which gave him great strength and power when it enlarged him. He was defeated by the Thunderstorm Megazord, but saved by Lothor and shrunk down to be Marah's new pet. Lothor later restored him to normal accidentally.

An alternate dimension that Goldwinger sent Tori to had Choobo smarter than Zurgane where both of them worked at Storm Chargers. He is among those who help Mayor Lothor fight the evil Ninja Rangers.

Choobo was defeated by Shane as the Red Battlized Ranger although it was not quite clear if he was completely destroyed (he was only seen falling down after being blasted by the Battilizer's lasers).

Choobo later appears in the video game Power Rangers: Super Legends.

Choobo is voiced by Bruce Hopkins in the TV series and by David Lodge in the Power Rangers: Super Legends video game.

Motodrone
Motodrone was originally Perry, a motorcycle expert who was conducting an experiment to create a new generation of motorcycle. Unfortunately, there was an accident and he became the scorpion-like cyborg Motodrone. Hunter destroyed Motodrone and freed Perry with his newly acquired Ninja Glider Cycle. Motodrone was later rebuilt and revived by Lothor by transferring the soul of a Kelzak.

Motodrone wielded a double-bladed staff, rode on a motorcycle, and wore a brown cloak when he was revived. Motodrone then fought the Power Rangers under the command of Lothor.

An alternate dimension that Goldwinger transported Tori to had Motodrone as the aid of Mayor Lothor. He is among those who help Mayor Lothor fight the evil Ninja Rangers.

He was later destroyed by Vexacus when he attempted to reveal Vexacus' treacherous agenda to Lothor. He came back once more from the Abyss, but was quickly defeated one final time by Shane (although like the other generals, it was not revealed if he was completely destroyed since he was only seen falling down after being blasted).

Motodrone is voiced by Craig Parker.

Vexacus
Vexacus is a shark-like alien bounty hunter and the "sworn enemy" and rival of Lothor, who ended up working for Lothor whilst plotting against him. Vexacus wielded a jagged sword and a fan blade, and could summon a giant "land shark" mecha. On some occasions, he would use monsters that are Phantom Beast-themed.

He first comes to Earth hunting Skyla, a Carminian who can give her powers to someone when she dies. He fails in his attempt to capture these powers, and ends up stranded when his ship is shot down after being defeated by Shane Clarke with his Red Wind Battlizer.

Vexacus becomes Lothor's head general, and often clashes with Zurgane.

An alternate dimension that Goldwinger sends Tori to on Vexacus' orders had that dimension's Vexacus as a good guy. He is among those who help Lothor fight the evil Ninja Rangers.

Vexacus' feud with Zurgane advances to a point where, after Zurgane's Hyper Zurganezord is destroyed, Vexacus kills him – the first part of a plan to destroy all the other generals and take over from Lothor. He later takes out Motodrone and attempts the same with Shimazu, while teaming up with Marah and Kapri to take down Lothor. However, the final two-parter revealed he had been deliberately set up by Lothor to destroy all the generals in order to overload the Abyss of Evil; Marah and Kapri, who had been in on Lothor's plan, arranged for Vexacus' destruction in battle with the Rangers (taking the Thunder Megazord with him).

He returns again after the Abyss is opened, but is quickly defeated and destroyed by Shane.

Vexacus is voiced by Michael Hurst.

Shimazu
Shimazu is a statue that contains the reincarnation of an evil clown/peafowl-like Japanese warlord legend. He was brought to life accidentally during a battle between Cam, the Green Samurai Ranger, and Motodrone, due to Motodrone's reanimated energy. He joined Lothor's army (where Lothor gave Shimazu the power of speech) and unleashed three creatures called Wolfblades. Though the Rangers defeated him, he remained a part of Lothor's army for the remainder of the series. There was a rare occasion if he were to be seen with a body part-inspired monster.

An alternate dimension that Goldwinger sent Tori to had Shimazu as a good guy. He is among those who help Mayor Lothor fight the evil Ninja Rangers.

Shimazu, along with Vexacus, plotted to take control of Lothor's ship, but he was eventually betrayed. He later teamed up with Marah and Kapri, who at the time seemed to be masterminds, having concealed their genius. They used him to try to destroy the Rangers in their Zords. However, after the Zords were destroyed by the Rangers, Marah and Kapri destroyed him, having been working for Lothor throughout.

Shimazu returned from the Abyss of Evil in the finale episode, and was quickly defeated again by the Red Wind Ranger (although it wasn't revealed if he was completely destroyed).

Shimazu is voiced by Jeremy Birchall.

Marah and Kapri
Marah and Kapri are sisters and the nieces of Lothor by marriage. Exactly who Lothor marries to gain this relation is never made clear. All is known is that their parents allowed them to stay with Lothor during his quest for power.

Though they are both stereotypically foolish, Marah (who has black hair and a bee-looking headress) is rather more ditzy than Kapri. Kapri (who has pink hair), on the other hand, is meaner and more scornful (especially of Marah). Marah and Kapri constantly tried to prove to their uncle that they were evil enough to be in his army, and frequently showed each other up and the other generals in order to do so. Most often, Lothor considered them pests at best. Kapri used Lothor's PAM (Personal Alien Manager) to summon monstrous warriors from across the galaxy, and also to increase them to massive size with the Scroll of Empowerment.

On one occasion, Marah was apparently kicked out of Lothor's army when her old friend Beevil upstaged her. Miserable, she gained the trust of Dustin Brooks, the Yellow Wind Ranger, to defeat Beevil. In the end, however, it was revealed to be part of a deception to make Beevil more powerful. Beevil was destroyed, but Lothor and the other villains nonetheless congratulated Marah for betraying Dustin. Marah appeared to be regretful of it, having seemingly developed romantic feelings for Dustin. Despite this, she claimed that she was indeed evil.

An alternate dimension that Goldwinger sent Tori to had that dimension's Marah and Kapri working as hippies. They even help Mayor Lothor fight the evil Ninja Rangers. After the Ninja Rangers were defeated and made to renounce their evil ways, Marah and Kapri suggested to Tori to return to her dimension the same way that she came into their dimension.

Towards the end of the series, Marah and Kapri appeared to have hidden depths when they apparently arranged for Lothor's generals to overthrow him. It appeared that they were masterminds, merely hiding behind their ignorance, but this was soon revealed to be a ploy by Lothor himself. He was using them to destroy all of his own generals, and add their power to the Abyss of Evil, which would overflow and destroy the world. When their usefulness was at its end, though, Lothor betrayed them too and left them aboard the Dark Ship as it was about to explode. This led to them helping to free the captive Ninja Students and paved the way for their redemption. When they begin training at the Wind Ninja Academy, Marah was seen in a ninja suit with an orange stripe (presumably meaning fire) and Kapri in a similar one with a pink stripe (presumably meaning ice). In Power Rangers Dino Thunder, though shocked by Lothor's return, Marah and Kapri tricked him into letting them rejoin his cause. They show their true colors in helping free both Sensei Watanabe and the Ninja Students. Both Kapri and Marah share a bonding moment with Cam, while Lothor watches on in disgust after realizing he had been duped. This leads to him and Mesogog to fight against one another.

Kapri's powers include teleportation, clothes transformation, energy projection, martial arts skils and shielding. She can project ice frost, control her sword while attacking her enemies, and can blow her enemies away with her breath. Marah's powers consist of energy projection, combat techniques, shielding, flight, clothes transformation, and weapon-hand extension, martial arts skills and teleportation.

Marah is portrayed by Katrina Devine while Kapri is portrayed by Katrina Browne.

Kelzaks
The Kelzaks are Lothor's foot soldiers. They have black bodies, black pony-tails, and red Serpent-faces. They normally domesticate swords and clubs as weapons.

In "The Wild Wipeout," the Kelzaks are shown to be co-existing with humans alongside the known monsters up to this episode. Some Kelzaks help Mayor Lothor and his allies fight the Evil Ninja Rangers.

Kelzak Furies
The Kelzak Furies resemble the Kelzaks, but they have red bodies and are more powerful and harder to beat.

Evil Ninja Rangers
When Tori got teleported to an alternate dimension by Goldwinger in "The Wild Wipeout", she discovered that the counterparts of her fellow Rangers (yet they don't have their version of Tori for some unknown reason) and Sensei Kanoi are evil while the counterparts from Lothor (who was the Mayor of Blue Bay Harbor), his nieces and generals, the Kelzaks, and the monsters up to this episode were good where they were interacting with Blue Bay Harbor's citizens. After being unable to get Mayor Lothor to help deal with the evil Ninja Rangers, Tori tried to fight them only to be overwhelmed. With Tori receiving the last minute help of Mayor Lothor and his allies, the evil Ninja Rangers were defeated and forced to renounce their evil ways.

Monsters
These are the monsters used by Lothor and his minions. The monsters are adapted from the monsters that appeared in Ninpuu Sentai Hurricaneger. To make a monster grow, Lothor would have the Scroll of Empowerment descend to Earth and emit energy that would enlarge the monster. When a monster is defeated, they end up in the Abyss of Evil.

 Blue Face (voiced by Craig Parker) – A mantis monster. Blue Face was sent to Earth by Lothor to capture the remainder of the Wind Ninja Academy students.
 Mad Magnet (voiced by Craig Parker) – A robotic spider/magnet monster that can magnetize and de-magnetize anything.
 Copybot (voiced by Jason Hoyte) – A chameleon monster that can create shadow clones of anyone, and speaks only in rhymes.
 Terramole (voiced by Mark Wright) – A robotic mole/drill monster.
 Amphibidor (voiced by Mark Wright) – A robotic frog/boiler monster.
 Florabundicus (voiced by Cal Wilson) – A hibiscus monster.
 Snipster (voiced by Jeremy Birchall) – A robotic rabbit/scissors monster that has the ability to cause conflict between people.
 Toxipod (voiced by John Leigh) – A snail monster.
 Super Toxipod (voiced by John Leigh) – A snail monster that is stronger than the original Toxipod.
 Bopp-A-Roo (voiced by Mark Wright) – A robotic kangaroo/roulette monster that liked to box and speak in made up words.
 General Trayf (voiced by Greg Johnson) – General Trayf is a pig monster that was recruited by Zurgane to use his powers against the Rangers.
 Madtropolis (voiced by Dallas Barnett) – Madtropolis is an eye-inspired monster that looks like he has a city on his head. He was sent to steal the power from the Power Rangers. He is able to create illusions that the Rangers must overcome.
 Hip Hopper – A cicada monster.
 Tentacreep – An octopus monster.
 Starvark (voiced by Jorge Vargas) – A tapir/baku monster.
 Skyscrapper – A robotic amoeba/blast furnace monster.
 Magic Moustache – A catfish monster.
 Sucker (voiced by Dene Young) – A teeth-inspired mosquito monster whose bite can slowly turn anyone into a human/insect hybrid.
 Fragra (voiced by Penny Ashton) – A hand-inspired perfume monster. She can trap people in perfume bottles.
 Mr. Ratwell (voiced by Mark Wright impersonating Paul Lynde) – A robotic mouse/Cupid monster.
 DJ Drummond (voiced by Michael Hurst) – A robotic tailo-themed monster with electric eel heads instead of hands.
 Beevil (voiced by Lori Dungey) – A robotic bee monster who was a friend of Marah.
 Footzilla (voiced by Joel Tobeck) – A one-eyed foot-themed coil spring monster in a foot-shaped mask.
 Slob Goblin (voiced by Joel Tobeck) – A tongue-inspired monster in mailbox-like armor.
 "Morty Board" – A robotic mushroom/stationery monster.
 Wolfblades – Three wolf monsters conjured by Shimazu. They come in black, brown, and white. The three Wolfblades can combine into a three-faced Wolfblade called the Wolfblade Conglomerate.
 Goldwinger (voiced by Glen Drake) – A robotic moth monster that has a device on him that enables him to heal any wound. In addition, he has a dust that can send anyone to an alternate dimension.
 "Bald Loser" - A nose-inspired comedian monster who was previously defeated by Rangers.
 Inflatron (voiced by Dene Young) – An ear-inspired balloon monster.
 Eyezak – A fear-inducing scorpion monster with tentacles for arms.
 Condortron – A Yatagarasu monster.
 Ocelot Monster – A female ocelot/Bakeneko-themed monster.
 Chinese Dragon Monster – A Chinese dragon-like monster.

Notes

References

External links
 Official Power Rangers Website

Television characters introduced in 2003
Ninja Storm
Fictional ninja
Characters